Pete Smith (born 1947) is an American former professional basketball player.

Smith was born in Albany, Georgia, and grew up in the rural southern area of the state. He joined the Cincinnati Bearcats to play college basketball but returned to Georgia without playing due to homesickness. Smith instead played for the Valdosta State Blazers, where he was the first black athlete in the school's history. He led the team in points, and set school records for most field goals attempted and best rebound average during his only season with the Blazers. Smith was drafted by the Buffalo Braves as the 197th overall pick of the 1971 NBA draft. He played five games in the American Basketball Association (ABA) as a member of the San Diego Conquistadors during the 1972–73 season. Smith spent time in training camp with the Atlanta Hawks of the National Basketball Association (NBA) but never played in an NBA game. He was one of the final cuts of the New York Nets of the ABA before the start of the 1975–76 season.

Smith worked as a truck driver in Atlanta after his retirement from basketball. His son, Josh Smith, played professionally in the NBA.

References

External links
 or at nasljerseys.com

1947 births
Living people
21st-century African-American people
20th-century African-American sportspeople
African-American basketball players
American men's basketball players
Basketball players from Georgia (U.S. state)
Buffalo Braves draft picks
Power forwards (basketball)
San Diego Conquistadors players
Sportspeople from Albany, Georgia
Valdosta State Blazers men's basketball players